The Supreme Administrative Court of Sweden (before 2011 Regeringsrätten, acronym RR or RegR) is the supreme court and the third and final tier for administrative court cases in Sweden, and is located in Stockholm. It has a parallel status to that of the Supreme Court of Sweden, which is the supreme court for criminal and civil law cases.

It hears cases which have been decided by one of the four Administrative courts of appeal, which represent the second tier for administrative court cases in Sweden. Before a case can be decided, a leave to appeal must be obtained, which is typically only granted when the case is of interest as a precedent. The bulk of its caseload consist of taxation and social security cases.

Justices of the Supreme Administrative Court are appointed by government, but the court as an institution is independent of the Riksdag, and the government is not able to interfere with the decisions of the court. By law, there shall be fourteen Justices of the Supreme Administrative Court or such a higher a number as may be required, at the government's discretion. As of 2009, there were eighteen Justices in the court. One of the Justices serves as president and head of the court, and is appointed by the government to this function.

Since 2018, justice Helena Jäderblom serves as the court's president. In total the court has approximately 100 employees.

History 
The court was founded in 1909. Before that, the Supreme Court of Sweden handed administrative court matters as well. From 1972 until 2009, the Supreme Administrative Court resided in the Stenbock Palace on the Riddarholmen islet in central Stockholm. Since 2011 the court sits in Kammarrättens hus (the former Administrative Court of Appeal Building) and the Sparre Palace on Riddarholmen.

Presidents of the Supreme Administrative Court of Sweden
Originally, there were no regulations on the presidency of the Supreme Administrative Court. According to practice, the senior member of the post served as chair when the court met in plenary session, and the second oldest served as department chair. In its report of 1966, the Administrative Court Committee (Förvaltningsdomstolskommittén) proposed a new order, in which the President of the Supreme Administrative Court (as well as the chair of a section of the Supreme Administrative Court) was appointed by the King in Council. This became a reality in the Administrative Process Reform (Förvaltningsprocessreformen) in 1972. In the Supreme Court, the corresponding reform had been implemented in 1946.

 1972–1972: Nils Lorichs
 1972–1975: Olov Hegrelius
 1975–1980: Carl Åbjörnsson
 1980–1987: Bengt Wieslander
 1987–1990: Bengt Hamdahl
 1990–1994: Magnus Sjöberg
 1994–1996: Göran Wahlgren
 1996–2000: Gunnar Björne
 2000–2005: Hans Ragnemalm
 2005–2007: Rune Lavin
 2007–2010: Sten Heckscher
 2011–2018: Mats Melin
 2018–present: Helena Jäderblom

References 

Courts in Sweden
Sweden
Administrative courts